Bastián Jean Yáñez Miranda (born 21 June 2001) is a Chilean professional footballer who plays as a forward for Chilean Primera División side Unión Española.

Club career
Yáñez came to Unión Española at the age of 8 and became champion of the Campeonato Nacional Sub 17 (National under-17 Championship) in 2018. In the same year, he made his professional debut in a Chilean Primera División match against O'Higgins.

International career
In September 2021, he was called up to the Chile senior team for the 2022 FIFA World Cup qualifiers, but he was withdrawn from the squad due to an injury.

Yáñez made his debut for the Chile national team on 9 December 2021 in a 2–2 draw against Mexico.

He represented Chile at under-23 level in a 1–0 win against Peru U23 on 31 August 2022, in the context of preparations for the 2023 Pan American Games.

Honours
Unión Española U17
Campeonato Nacional Sub-17 (1): 2018

References

External links

Bastián Yáñez at playmakerstats.com (English version of ceroacero.es)

2001 births
Living people
Footballers from Santiago
Chilean footballers
Chile international footballers
Chile youth international footballers
Chilean Primera División players
Unión Española footballers
Association football forwards